Abronia matudai, Matuda's arboreal alligator lizard, is a species of endangered arboreal alligator lizard in the family Anguidae. The species, which was originally described in 1946 by Norman Hartweg and Joseph Tihen, is endemic to Central America.

Etymology
The specific name, matudai, is in honor of Eizi Matuda, a Japanese-born Mexican botanist.

Geographic range
A. matudai is native to southwestern Guatemala and southeastern Chiapas, Mexico.

Habitat

Description
Dorsally, A. matudai is green in life (fading to blue gray in alcohol), with about 11 dark crossbars on the head and body, and a corresponding number on the tail.

Reproduction
A. matudai is viviparous.

References

Further reading
Hartweg N, Tihen JA (1946). "Lizards of the Genus Gerrhonotus from Chiapas, Mexico". Occasional Papers, University of Michigan Museum of Zoology (497): 1–16. (Gerrhonotus matudai, new species, pp. 3–5).
Tihen JA (1949). "The Genera of Gerrhonotine Lizards". American Midland Naturalist 41: 579–601. (Abronia matudai, new combination, p. 591).

Reptiles of Guatemala
Reptiles of Mexico
Abronia
Reptiles described in 1946
Taxa named by Norman Edouard Hartweg